"Sometimes" is a song by Australian rock band Midnight Oil, from their sixth studio album Diesel and Dust, released in 1987. 

A live recording from 1989 was released in April 1992, as the lead single from the band's compilation of live recordings album, Scream in Blue. The song peaked at number 33 in Australia.

Track listing

Charts

References

1987 songs
1992 singles
Midnight Oil songs
Columbia Records singles
Songs written by Rob Hirst
Songs written by Jim Moginie
Songs written by Peter Garrett